Caecum brasilicum is a species of minute sea snail, a marine gastropod mollusk or micromollusk in the family Caecidae.

Distribution
Caecum brasilicum has been found to live in the Exclusive economic zone of Brazil or Blue Amazon.

Description 
The maximum recorded shell length is 4 mm.

Habitat 
Minimum recorded depth is 2 m. Maximum recorded depth is 24 m.

References

Caecidae
Gastropods described in 1874